Alison Donalty is the cover designer for the renowned black-humored children's books A Series of Unfortunate Events, and designed series spin-off The Beatrice Letters. Her name has a cameo appearance in The Hostile Hospital as an anagram, "Lisa N. Lootnday", on a list of patients.

References

American graphic designers
Women graphic designers
Living people
Year of birth missing (living people)
Place of birth missing (living people)